Władysław Beszterda (born 28 September 1951) is a Polish rower. He competed in the men's eight event at the 1980 Summer Olympics.

References

External links
 

1951 births
Living people
Polish male rowers
Olympic rowers of Poland
Rowers at the 1980 Summer Olympics
Sportspeople from Gdańsk